Denis Popović (born 15 October 1989) is a Slovenian professional footballer who plays for Celje. Primarily a central midfielder, he can also play as a right winger.

Club career

FC Zürich 
On 2 July 2019, Popović signed a three-year contract with Swiss club FC Zürich. He made twelve appearances for the club in all competitions during the 2019–20 season, before terminating his contract on 29 January 2020.

Krylia Sovetov Samara
On 2 February 2020, he returned to Russia and signed a two-and-a-half-year contract with Krylia Sovetov Samara. He left Krylia Sovetov on 20 August 2020.

Qingdao Huanghai
On 30 August 2020, Popović joined Chinese Super League side Qingdao Huanghai.

Anorthosis Famagusta
On 19 July 2021, Popović signed with Cypriot First Division club Anorthosis Famagusta on a two-year contract until 2023. His contract with Anorthosis was terminated by mutual consent on 26 August 2022.

International career
Popović made his debut for Slovenia on 7 June 2019 in a Euro 2020 qualifier against Austria as a 63rd-minute substitute.

Career statistics

Honours
Orenburg
Russian Football National League: 2017–18

References

External links
 
 

1989 births
Living people
Sportspeople from Celje
Slovenian footballers
Slovenia international footballers
Association football midfielders
Association football wingers
Slovenian Second League players
Slovenian PrvaLiga players
Super League Greece players
I liga players
Ekstraklasa players
Russian Premier League players
Russian First League players
Swiss Super League players
Chinese Super League players
Cypriot First Division players
NK Celje players
FC Koper players
Panthrakikos F.C. players
GKS Tychy players
Olimpia Grudziądz players
Wisła Kraków players
FC Orenburg players
FC Zürich players
PFC Krylia Sovetov Samara players
Qingdao F.C. players
Anorthosis Famagusta F.C. players
Slovenian expatriate footballers
Expatriate footballers in Greece
Slovenian expatriate sportspeople in Greece
Expatriate footballers in Poland
Slovenian expatriate sportspeople in Poland
Expatriate footballers in Russia
Slovenian expatriate sportspeople in Russia
Expatriate footballers in Switzerland
Slovenian expatriate sportspeople in Switzerland
Expatriate footballers in China
Slovenian expatriate sportspeople in China
Expatriate footballers in Cyprus
Slovenian expatriate sportspeople in Cyprus